The Circular Mission (Spanish: Misión circular) was a system of missions established by the Society of Jesus in Chiloé Archipelago. It began as an experimental mission in 1608 when various places populated by Huilliches and Spaniards in the archipelago were visited in a series of voyages during spring and summer. At each stop the Jesuits usually preached for three days before continuing the journey to the next stop. In 1617 the mission was formalized as permanent but continued to be carried out as a series of visits to populated places returning every year to the same locations. During winter the Jesuit missionaries stayed in Castro. The Jesuits are reported to have established 77 chapels by 1755.

See also
Cristóbal Talcapillán
Huilliche uprising of 1712
Mission of Nahuel Huapi
Mission of Río Bueno

References 

History of Chiloé
Religion in Chiloé
Spanish missions in Chile
Jesuit history in South America
Jesuit missions